Ranatovce is a village located in the municipality of Preševo, Serbia. According to the 2002 census, the village has a population of 65 people. Of these, 64 were ethnic Albanians, and 1 other.

References

Populated places in Pčinja District
Albanian communities in Serbia